Niang is a West African surname, and may refer to;

 Abdoulaye Niang -  Senegalese–French footballer
 Babacar Niang - retired Senegalese-French middle distance runner
 Babacar Niang - French basketball player
 El-Hadji Arona Niang - Senegalese footballer
 Fatou Niang Siga - Senegalese author and schoolteacher
 Georges Niang (born 1993), American basketball player
 Hamane Niang - Malian politician
 Jean-Ismaila Niang - Senegalese footballer
 Lucas Niang (born 1998), American football player
 Mamadou Niang - Senegalese footballer
 Mame Niang - Senegalese footballer
 M'Baye Niang - French footballer
 Mohamed Niang - Senegalese basketball player
 Nafissatou Niang Diallo - Senegalese writer
 Ousmane Niang - Senegalese sprinter

References 

Senegalese surnames